Mount Calvary Lutheran Church, also known as Hawksbill Church, Hacksbill Church, Hoxbiehl Church, and Gomer's Church, is an historic Lutheran church with adjacent cemetery located near the town of Luray in Page County, Virginia, United States.

History
It is not known when this congregation was established. In 1765 John Schwarbach, who apparently was temporarily rendering pastoral services, conveyed  of land to Peter Painter and Jacob Shaffer, trustees of this church. The church was first called the “Hoxbiehl” or “Hacksbill” (Hawksbill), later “Comer’s Church” due to so many members by that name, and lastly “Mount Calvary.” This church was first served by the Pennsylvania Ministerium, Bathaser Sauer having attended a convention as a lay delegate. In 1813, it was of the five valley churches to unite with the Evangelical Lutheran North Carolina Synod, and in 1820 it joined the Evangelical Lutheran Tennessee Synod.

Mount Calvary was originally a union church shared by members of the Lutheran and Reformed faiths. The insistence on conducting all church functions in the German language led to the cancellation of the union agreement in 1832, when the Reformed people formed a separate congregation.

The church served an active congregation until 1959, when regular services ceased.

Mount Calvary was the mother church of five other congregations in Page County that were organized, directly or indirectly, from her membership: Morning Star (organized 29 November 1873), Grace (organized 10 March 1877), St. Mark’s (organized 1876), St. James’ (Rileyville, organized 1884), and Beth Eden (organized 31 December 1896).

Pastors
The following pastors have served Mount Calvary Church.

 Johannes Schwarbach 1765-1775

Besides pastors from Madison County, Virginia, Peter Muhlenberg and Christian Streit rendered occasional pastoral services.

 Paul Henkel 1784-1823
 James Hoffman (Reformed) 1796-1806
 Wilhelm G. Forster 1798-1806
 Johann Voltz (John Foltz) 1806-1810
 Peter Schmucker 1813-1820
 Paul Henkel 1821-1822
 George Leidy (Reformed) 1822-1823
 Ambrose Henkel 1823-1837
 Jacob Stirewalt 1837-1860
 Socrates Henkel 1860-1869
 John Nathaniel Stirewalt 1869-1906
 D.L. Miller 1907-1909 (His call was to the Stony Man pastorate)
 Philip Loy Snapp 1910–1921 (His call was to the Stony Man pastorate)
 Carroll Irving Morgan 1921-1925
 Abner Lafayette Boliek 1927-1933
 B.D. Castor 1934-1944
 H.B. Arehart 1945-1954
 R.H. Ebert 1956-1959

Church buildings
It is not known in what year a church was first built on this site. However, on August 6, 1765, Johannes Schwarbach, who apparently was temporarily rendering pastoral services, conveyed  of land to Peter Painter and Jacob Shaffer, trustees of the church.

The old log church stood in front of and to the right of the present building. In 1937, one could still see where the ground had been disturbed for the foundation. It was rectangular in shape, with two front entrances. It was used not only as a church, but also as a school. Near the old church and on the lower side of the. graveyard was a two-story log building that was also used as a school.

The current structure is the third church at the location, and was constructed in 1848.  The building is a two-story rectangular brick structure with a metal gable roof. Since its construction, the church has seen no additions and only minor alterations to the interior and exterior of the building. The site includes a small cemetery and a non-contributing wooden outhouse. , the church was undergoing restoration with the possibility of using the building again.

The church was listed on the Virginia Landmarks Register on June 17, 1998, and the National Register of Historic Places on June 3, 2008.

Church register
The only existing church register for Mount Calvary was acquired in 1817. The early entries are in German. The book is in two parts and has two title pages. In 1979, the book was in the possession of Harry L. Comer of Page County, Virginia. There are at least two English translations of its pages:

 Finck, William J., translator. Early Records of Mt. Calvary Lutheran Church, Page County, Virginia. St. Louis: Joseph Willard Baker, October 10, 1969.
 Wust, Klaus, translator. The Record of Hawksbill Church 1788-1850 Page County, VA. Edinburg, Virginia: Shenandoah History, 1979.

Tradition says that an earlier church register was lost in the Civil War.

References
Cassell, C. W.; W. J. Finck; and Elon O. Henkel, editors, "Mt. Calvary," History of the Lutheran Church in Virginia and East Tennessee. Strasburg, Virginia: Shenandoah Publishing House, Inc., 1930, pages 195 and 198. Digital images. Ancestry.com. https://www.ancestry.com : 2008.
Finck, William J., translator. Early Records of Mt. Calvary Lutheran Church, Page County, Virginia. St. Louis: Joseph Willard Baker, 19 October 1969.

 and accompanying photo.

United States. Works Progress Administration of Virginia Historical Inventory, County: Page, Class: Church, "Mt. Calvary Church," PA-59, Research made by Vivian Black, Luray, Virginia, 18 January 1936, page 1; Digital images. Library of Virginia http://image.lva.virginia.gov/VHI/html/20/0594.html : 2019.
Wayland, John W. "Mt. Calvary Church," A History of Shenandoah County Virginia. 1927. Reprint, Strasburg, Virginia: Shenandoah Publishing House, Inc., 1976, page 411.
Wust, Klaus, translator. The Record of Hawksbill Church 1788-1850 Page County, VA. Edinburg, Virginia: Shenandoah History, 1979.

Footnotes

Churches on the National Register of Historic Places in Virginia
Lutheran churches in Virginia
Churches completed in 1848
National Register of Historic Places in Page County, Virginia